Albert Borg Olivier de Puget (born 15 April 1932 in Valletta; died 8 August 2017) was a Maltese diplomat who served as Ambassador to Paris with concurrent accreditation to Spain, Portugal and Switzerland as well as Malta's Permanent Delegate to UNESCO (1987-1990) and Washington, concurrently High Commissioner to Canada and Ambassador Designated to Mexico (1991-1997).

Borg Olivier de Puget was also a member of the Maltese Parliament from 1966 until 1981.  He served as Government Chief Whip (1966-1971) and as Opposition Chief Whip (1971-1974) and from 1971 to 1981, he was Shadow Minister of Commonwealth and Foreign Affairs and Shadow Minister of Tourism.  He was a member of the Nationalist Party (Malta).

References

Ambassadors of Malta to the United States
Ambassadors of Malta to France
High Commissioners of Malta to Canada
Ambassadors of Malta to Portugal
Ambassadors of Malta to Spain
Ambassadors of Malta to Switzerland
Ambassadors of Malta to Mexico
Nationalist Party (Malta) politicians
People from Valletta
20th-century Maltese politicians